Giulio is an Italian given name. It is also used as a surname. Notable people with the name include:

Given name

A–K
 Giulio Alberoni (1664–1752), Italian cardinal and statesman
 Giulio Alenio (1582–1649), Italian Jesuit missionary and scholar
 Giulio Alfieri (1924–2002), Italian automobile engineer
 Giulio Andreotti (1919–2013), Italian politician
 Giulio Carlo Argan (1909–1992), Italian politician and art historian
 Giulio Base (born 1964), Italian film director
 Giulio Berruti (born 1984), Italian film and television actor
 Giulio Bizzozero (1846–1901), Italian physician
 Giulio Bosetti (1930–2009), Italian actor and director
 Giulio Brogi (1935–2019), Italian actor
 Giulio Caccini ( 1545–1618), Florentine composer, significant innovator of the early Baroque era
 Giulio Calì (1895–1967), Italian actor
 Giulio Camillo ( 1480–1544), Italian philosopher
 Giulio Campagnola ( 1482–1515), Italian painter
 Giulio Campi (1500–1572), Italian painter and architect
 Giulio Cappelli (1911–1995), Italian footballer
 Giulio Caracciolo (archbishop of Cassano all'Jonio) (died 1599), 16th-century Roman Catholic archbishop
 Giulio Caracciolo (archbishop of Iconium) (born 1672), 17th-century Roman Catholic archbishop
 Giulio Carmassi (born 1981), Italian multi-instrumentalist
 Giulio Carmignani (1813–1890), Italian painter
 Giulio Ceretti (1868–1934), Italian engineer and entrepreneur
 Giulio Cesare (disambiguation), several people
 Giulio Ciccone (born 1994), Italian cyclist
 Giulio Clovio (1498–1578), Italian painter
 Giulio Cybo (1525–1548), Italian noble
 Giulio Doffi (1534–1596), Italian Roman Catholic prelate
 Giulio Donati (born 1990), Italian footballer
 Giulio Einaudi (1912–1999), Italian book publisher
 Giulio Favale (born 1998), Italian footballer
 Giulio Fioravanti (1923–1999), Italian operatic baritone
 Giulio Fiou (born 1938), Italian politician
 Giulio Gabrielli (1604–1677), Italian Catholic cardinal
 Giulio Gabrielli the Younger (1748–1822), Italian Catholic cardinal and diplomat
 Giulio Gallera (born 1969), Italian politician
 Giulio Gaudini (1904–1948), Italian fencer
 Giulio Gavotti (1882–1939), Italian pilot in the Italo-Turkish War and the first pilot to perform an aerial bombardment
 Giulio Giorello (1945–2020), Italian philosopher, mathematician and epistemologist
 Giulio Giuricich (born 1990), South African footballer

L–Z
 Giulio Lepschy (born 1935), Italian linguist and teacher
 Giulio Maceratini (1938–2020), Italian politician
 Giulio Maculani (1920–1980), Italian actor
 Giulio Martinat (1891–1943), Italian general
 Giulio de' Medici (1478–1534), better known as Pope Clement VII (1523–1534), 16th-century Catholic pope
 Giulio de' Medici ( 1533–1600), Italian noble
 Giulio Meotti, Italian journalist
 Giulio Migliaccio (born 1981), Italian footballer
 Giulio Monteverde (1837–1917), Italian sculptor and teacher
 Giulio Natta (1903–1979), Italian chemist, Nobel Prize laureate
 Giulio Oggioni (1916–1993), Italian bishop
 Giulio Orsini (died 1517), Italian condottiero
 Giulio Pace (1550–1635), Italian philosopher
 Giulio Parigi (1571–1635), Italian painter, engraver and architect
 Giulio Parodi (born 1997), Italian footballer
 Giulio Petroni (1917–2010), Italian filmmaker
 Giulio Pittarelli (1852–1934), Italian mathematician and painter
 Giulio Prisco (born 1957), Italian computer scientist
 Giulio Prosperetti (born 1946), Italian labor law scholar and judge
 Giulio Racah (1909–1965), Italian-Israeli mathematician and physicist
 Giulio Regeni (1988–2016), Italian murder victim
 Giulio Regondi (1823–1872), Italian composer
 Giulio Ricciarelli (born 1965), German-Italian actor
 Giulio Ricordi (1840–1912), Italian musician
 Giulio Rinaldi (1935–2011), Italian boxer
 Giulio Romano ( 1499–1546), Italian painter
 Giulio Rosati (1587–1917), Italian painter
 Giulio Rospigliosi, better known as Pope Clement IX (1600–1669), 17th-century Catholic pope
 Giulio Salvadori (1862–1928), Italian poet
 Giulio Sanseverino (born 1994), Italian footballer
 Giulio Santagata (born 1949), Italian politician
 Giulio Antonio Santorio (1532–1602), Italian cardinal
 Giulio Saraudi (1938–2005), Italian boxer
 Giulio Sarrocchi (1887–1971), Italian fencer
 Giulio Savelli (1941–2020), Italian politician
 Giulio Scarpati (born 1956), Italian actor
 Giulio Taccon (born 2002), Italian-Chinese pianist
 Giulio Toniolatti (born 1984), Italian rugby union player
 Giulio Tononi (born 1960), Italian neuroscientist and psychiatrist
 Giulio Turcato (1912–1995), Italian painter

Surname
 Carlo Ignazio Giulio (1803–1859), Italian mathematician and mechanical engineer

Numismatic
 Giulio, a currency and coin of the papal states first struck by Pope Julius II

See also
 Julio (disambiguation)
 Julian
 Giuliano (disambiguation)

Italian masculine given names
Surnames from given names
Surnames of Italian origin